Alpinia zerumbet, commonly known as shell ginger,  is a perennial species of ginger native to East Asia. They are grown as ornamentals and their leaves are used in cuisine and traditional medicine. They are also sometimes known as the pink porcelain lily, variegated ginger or butterfly ginger.

Characteristics 
It bears funnel-formed flowers. Flowers have white or pink perianths with yellow labella with red spots and stripes. There are three stamens, but only one has pollen. There is one pistil. The fruit is globose with many striations. In more typical conditions, it reaches  feet tall in the green house, and  feet tall, as a house plant.

It was originally called Alpinia speciosa, which was also the scientific name of torch ginger. To avoid the confusion, it was renamed as A. zerumbet while torch ginger was reclassified in the genus Etlingera. No species is called A. speciosa today.

Cultivation
Alpinia zerumbet is best grown in rich medium-wet, to wet well drained soils in full sun to part shade. Afternoon shade in hot summer climates, is recommended. Indoors, the plant must have bright light and humid conditions. Flowering rarely occurs before the second year.

Alpinia zerumbet is called a "shell ginger" or "shell flower" most commonly, because its individual pink flowers, especially when in bud, resemble sea shells. Other common names in English include "pink porcelain lily", "variegated ginger, "butterfly ginger", and "light galangal".

In Japanese it is known as gettō''' (ゲットウ). In Okinawan, it is known as sannin. In Chinese, it is known as yàn shānjiāng (艳山姜) or yuetao (月桃).

Uses
The plant's long leaf blades are used for wrapping zongzi, a traditional Chinese dish made of rice stuffed with different fillings. In Okinawa, Japan, A. zerumbet is known in the local language as sannin, or in Japanese as getto''. Its leaves are sold for making an herbal tea and are also used to flavor noodles and wrap muchi rice cakes.

Statistically, Okinawan natives who consume a traditional diet that includes shell ginger have a very long life expectancy.  Recent research has investigated its effects on human longevity and the phytochemicals that may be responsible.

Alpinia zerumbet (Shell ginger) contains many Kavalactones structurally related to the compounds in Kava (Piper methysticum) and may help prevent high glucose induced cell damage.

Gallery

References

External links

Alpinia zerumbet (Pers.) Burtt. et Smith Medicinal Plant Images Database (School of Chinese Medicine, Hong Kong Baptist University)  

zerumbet
Taxa named by Rosemary Margaret Smith